A Wife for Three Days (German: Eine Frau für drei Tage) is a 1944 German romantic drama film directed by Fritz Kirchhoff and starring Hannelore Schroth, Carl Raddatz and Ursula Herking. It was shot at the Babelsberg Studios in Potsdam and on location around Berlin and its vicinity including the River Havel and Wannsee. Filming also took place in Salzburg and Mondsee in Austria. The film's sets were designed by the art director Erich Kettelhut.

Cast
 Hannelore Schroth as Lisa Rodenius
 Carl Raddatz as 	Hanns Jennerberg
 Ursula Herking as 	Annemarie Helbing
 Charlotte Witthauer as 	Lotte Feldhammer
 Werner Scharf as 	Benno Schmitz
 Maria Zidek as 	Frau Witting
 Erich Dunskus as 	Taxifahrer
 Ewald Wenck as Taxifahrer
 Heddy Sven		
 Inge Stoldt	
 Margarete Genske	
 Jutta Carow	
 Christa Seifert	
 Herta Neupert	
 Fritz Gerlach		
 Walter Steinweg	
 Walter Bechmann		
 José Held

References

Bibliography
 Jacobsen, Wolfgang. Babelsberg: das Filmstudio. Argon, 1994.
 Kreimeier, Klaus. The Ufa Story: A History of Germany's Greatest Film Company, 1918-1945. University of California Press, 1999.
 Rentschler, Eric. The Ministry of Illusion: Nazi Cinema and Its Afterlife. Harvard University Press, 1996.

External links 
 

1944 films
Films of Nazi Germany
German drama films
1944 drama films
1940s German-language films
German black-and-white films
1940s German films
Films directed by Fritz Kirchhoff
UFA GmbH films
Films shot in Berlin
Films set in Berlin
Films shot at Babelsberg Studios

de:Eine Frau für drei Tage